Gariyoshi (গৰীয়সী) is an Assamese language monthly literary magazine published by the  Sahitya-Prakash, Tribune Building, Guwahati. It was founded by Chandra Prasad Saikia, who was also the first editor. The magazine is published monthly. Goriyoshi is instrumental in nurturing and projecting several talented short story writers and poets including Dhanada Debi, Jayanta Kumar Chakraborty, Arnab Jan Deka, Manikuntala Bhattacharya, Birinchi Kumar Rabha, Jiban Narah, Neelim Kumar and others. The magazine also collaborated with Katha International Short Story Festival in 2004 in creating All-India Katha-Goriyoshi Awards for best Assamese short stories. Dhrubajyoti Sarma, Arnab Jan Deka and Ratna Bharali Talukdar had been the recipients of those awards, whose short stories had been translated into English and read over in presence of an international galaxy of story writers and literary critics at Katha International Short Story Festival 2004.

References

1994 establishments in Assam
Assamese literature
Literary magazines published in India
Magazines established in 1994
Monthly magazines published in India